José María Muñagorri Berraondo (3 October 1902 - 12 October 1968) was a Spanish footballer who played as a forward for Real Madrid. He was one of the many products of Colegio del Pilar, and a historic player of Real Madrid, with whom he played for a whole decade.

Club career
José María Muñagorri was born in Buenos Aires as the son of Basque parents, and at the age of three his family moved to Madrid for professional reasons, and he began to study and to practice football at the Nuestra Señora Colegio del Pilar, which once was one of the capital's football cradles, best known for being a breeding ground for players for Madrid FC in its first years of existence. At the age of only 14, Muñagorri signed up as a member of Madrid FC in 1916 and became part of the youth team that a year later amazed the Spanish capital with its beautiful football, a team which also included, among others, César Sáez, Juan Monjardín and Pedro Escobal, with the latter two reaching the first team of Madrid FC, along with him, during 1919, with the three of them being all minors when they become a Real Madrid player.

In one of his first appearances for the club, he netted the winning goal of the decisive match of the 1919–20 Centro Championship against Racing de Madrid, and Racing's goalkeeper and captain Joaquín Pascual, started an angry protest that ended with the invasion of the field by hundreds of fans. Muñagorri played as an right winger and was often described as terrifying by his opponents and mathematical by his teammates, and as such, he played a fundamental role in helping Madrid reach the Copa del Rey final on two occasions (1924 and 1929), both ending in defeats, and he started on the former which they lost 0–1 to Real Unión, courtesy of a goal from José Echeveste.

Muñagorri was a Real Madrid undisputed starter for nearly a decade, however, his career was heavily affected by serious injuries, which interrupted his formidable performances. The most notable being one he suffered in the semifinal of the 1922 Copa del Rey against Real Unión, which took him out for eight months to recover, and when he returned to the field against a Czech team, Muñagorri suffered a new injury to my left leg. His third major injury occurred at the Real stadium, in another semi-final, but this time against Athletic Bilbao in the 1928–29 Copa del Rey, and the last one occurred during a training session at the Ciudad Lineal, which kept him away from football for a year. Muñagorri thus missed both the 1929 final, and without him, Madrid lost 1–2 to RCD Espanyol.

On 17 May 1924, Muñagorri participated in another historic eleven of Real Madrid, the one that opened the Estadio Chamartín on the eve of the 1924 Summer Olympics, in a friendly against Newcastle, netting once in a 3–2 win.

International career
Like many other Real Madrid players of that time, he played several matches for the 'Centro' (Madrid area) representative team, and he was part of the Madrid side that reached the final of the 1923–24 Prince of Asturias Cup, an inter-regional competition organized by the RFEF. Muñagorri did not play the infamous final against Catalonia which ended in a 4–4 draw, but he started in the replay of the final on 26 February 1924, replacing Antonio De Miguel in a 2–3 loss to their regional rivals.

The Peña incident
In 1927 a Madrid side with some guest players provided by other clubs began an American tour. In the port of Progreso in Mexico, the ship was anchored quite far from the port, so José María Peña and Juan Urquizu got into a boat and rowed through a place full of sharks, and when they reached the port, Urquizu climbed a ladder while Peña did it by a rope, but the latter slipped away and fell into the water near the sharks. Muñagorri immediately jump into the water to help Peña and eventually the sailors hoisted them back up and everything was a scare. A noble gesture from him which shows his companionship with his teammates.

Honours

Club
Real Madrid
Campeonato Regional Centro:
Champions (6): 1919–20, 1921–22, 1922–23, 1923–24, 1925–26, 1926–27 and 1927–28

Copa del Rey:
Runner-up (2): 1924 and 1929

International
Madrid
Prince of Asturias Cup:
Runner-up (1): 1923–24

References

1902 births
1968 deaths
Argentine emigrants to Spain
Footballers from Buenos Aires
Footballers from Madrid
Spanish footballers
Association football wingers
Real Madrid CF players